Stanford V (usually spoken as Stanford Five), is a chemotherapy regimen (with accompanying Radiation therapy) intended as a first-line treatment for Hodgkin lymphoma.  The regimen was developed in 1988, with the objective of maintaining a high remission rate while reducing the incidence of acute and long term toxicity, pulmonary damage, and sterility observed in alternative treatment regimens such as ABVD.  The chemical agents used are:
 A mustard derivative such as cyclophosphamide, chlormethine or ifosfamide
 Doxorubicin, an anti-tumor antibiotic
 Vinblastine, an alkaloid cell toxin
 Vincristine, another alkaloid cell toxin
 Bleomycin, another anti-tumor antibiotic
 Etoposide, a DNA toxin
 Prednisone, a corticosteroid

Drug Regimen

The chemotherapy part of Stanford V treatment can last anywhere from 8 to 12 weeks, depending on the staging of the disease.  In many cases, this is followed by radiation therapy for anywhere from 2 to 6 weeks to the affected areas of the body.

Stanford V is a more rigorously administered form of chemotherapy, with treatments roughly twice as fast as those of other Hodgkin lymphoma treatments. However, in a randomized controlled study, Stanford V was inferior to ABVD. This study has been criticized for not adhering to the proper Stanford V protocol. Specifically, the radiation therapy component following chemotherapy was not properly administered in the Italian study. A retrospective study from the Memorial Sloan-Kettering Cancer Center displayed results similar to the Stanford Cancer Center's own experience. The study concluded that, "Stanford V with appropriate radiotherapy is a highly effective regimen for locally extensive and advanced HL."

References

External links
 Lymphoma Information Network
 
 Includes table for schedule

Chemotherapy regimens used in lymphoma
Hodgkin lymphoma